This is a list of geographic place names, or toponyms, in Riverside County, California.  The county itself was named for the city of Riverside, the county seat, which in turn was named for its location beside the Santa Ana River.

Municipalities

Topographic place names

See also
 Etymology
 Origin of the name California
 List of place names of Native American origin in California
 List of counties in California, including etymologies
 Lists of U.S. county name etymologies
 List of U.S. county name etymologies (N–R)
 List of state and territory name etymologies of the United States

References

Bibliography

Citations

Riverside County, California
Riverside County